"That Happy Feeling" is an instrumental pop music composed by Ghanaian musician Guy Warren in 1956 under the original title "An African's Prayer (Eyi Wala Dong)", and recorded as a single by Bert Kaempfert.

Background
The track was recorded on March 16, 1962, and featured as the second cut on his album A Swingin' Safari.  That song and the title track were among the first pop instrumentals to incorporate elements of South African music.  It is also the title track of what is virtually the same album as the German A Swingin' Safari, issued under a different name in America.

Chart performance
Although Kaempfert's recording of the tune only peaked at number 67 on the Billboard Hot 100 chart, when issued as a single in 1962, its upbeat style, flute/marimba melody line and trumpet/trombone arpeggios combined with a full string section, a brass section, hand claps, guitars, and chorus helped it to become a staple of beautiful music radio.

Popular culture
The tune also proved to be a natural choice for locally produced children's television programming, especially in the United States:  
In New York City, Sandy Becker used it as the theme for his local morning program on WNEW 
In Southern California, the song was used between children's programs during the early days of KBSC Corona/Los Angeles.  It was played over the title card of the station's logo and not always to its conclusion, presumably because a master control technician was busy cueing the tape of whatever show was scheduled to air. The instrumental was used for station sign on and sign off at TV stations once owned by the former Kaiser Broadcasting System, including WKBS-TV (Philadelphia) Channel 48 in Burlington, New Jersey,  and Philadelphia, Pennsylvania and WKBF-TV Channel 61 in Cleveland, Ohio.  Both stations are now defunct.
The song was also used on another Los Angeles television station, KABC-TV Channel 7, when the station would sign on in the early morning to begin its broadcast day well before round-the-clock broadcasting became the norm much later.
It is used in Adam Elliot's 2009 film, Mary and Max.
It is also used by the UK's Cambridge Talking News as its signature tune on its weekly recordings for the blind and partially sighted.
A version sung by Herb Oscar Anderson was used on WABC Radio 770

References

External links
Ordering information and brief history at Amazon.com
Awards/charts section at Kaempfert.de

1962 singles
1960s instrumentals
1956 songs